The 2023 USL League Two season is the 29th season of USL League Two.

The regular season begins on May 6 and will end on July 18. 122 teams will participate in this season.

Team changes

New teams
Academica SC (Turlock, CA)
Arizona Arsenal SC (Mesa, AZ)
Bavarian United SC (Milwaukee, WI)
Boulder County United (Lafayette, CO)
Brevard SC (Melbourne, FL)
Capo FC (San Juan Capistrano, CA)
FC Buffalo
FC Carolinas (Waxhaws, NC)
Ironbound SC (Newark, NJ)
Monterey Bay FC 2 (Salinas, CA)
North Alabama SC (Huntsville, AL)
Redlands FC (Redlands, CA)
RKC Soccer Club (Racine & Kenosha, WI)
Rochester FC (Rochester, MN)
St. Charles FC (St. Charles, MO)
Sarasota Paradise (Sarasota, FL)
United PDX (Portland, OR)
Virginia Marauders FC (Winchester, VA)

Departing teams
Caledonia SC
Central Valley Fuego II
Chicago FC United
Commonwealth Cardinals FC
FC Golden State Force
Kaw Valley FC
One Knoxville SC (to USL League One)
OVF Alliance
Peachtree City MOBA
St. Louis Lions
Tri-Cities Otters

Returning teams
FC Tucson (from USL League One)

Name changes
Blackwatch Rush to Albany Rush
Florida Tropics SC to Swan City SC

On hiatus
South Georgia Tormenta FC 2

Standings

Eastern Conference

Northeast Division

Mid Atlantic Division

Metropolitan Division

Chesapeake Division

South Atlantic Division

Central Conference

Great Lakes Division

Heartland Division

Valley Division

Deep North Division

Southern Conference

South Central Division

Southeast Division

South Florida Division

Mid South Division

Lone Star Division

Western Conference

Mountain Division

Northwest Division

Nor Cal Division

Southwest Division

References

External links
 USL League Two website

2023
2023 in American soccer leagues
2023 in Canadian soccer